List of major active US Navy bases, stations and other facilities.

Within the United States

California
Concord Naval Weapons Station
Fleet Numerical Meteorology and Oceanography Center
Naval Air Weapons Station China Lake
Naval Base San Diego
Naval Base Coronado
Naval Amphibious Base Coronado
Naval Air Station North Island
Naval Outlying Field Imperial Beach
Naval Auxiliary Landing Field San Clemente Island
Naval Base Point Loma
Naval Medical Center San Diego
Naval Air Facility El Centro
Naval Air Station Lemoore
Naval Support Activity Monterey
Naval Postgraduate School
Naval Weapons Station Seal Beach
Naval Base Ventura County
Naval Air Station Point Mugu
Naval Construction Battalion Center Port Hueneme
Naval Outlying Landing Field San Nicolas Island
Naval Surface Warfare Center

Connecticut
Naval Submarine Base New London

Florida
Naval Air Station Jacksonville
Naval Air Station Key West
Naval Station Mayport
Naval Support Activity Orlando
Naval Support Activity Panama City
Naval Air Station Pensacola
Naval Air Station Pensacola Corry Station
Naval Air Station Whiting Field
Naval Ordnance Test Unit Cape Canaveral

Georgia
Naval Submarine Base Kings Bay

Hawaii
Naval Computer and Telecommunications Area Master Station Pacific
Pacific Missile Range Facility
Naval Base Pearl Harbor
NSGA Kunia
Naval Radio Transmitting Facility Lualualei

Illinois
Naval Station Great Lakes

Indiana
Naval Surface Warfare Center Crane Division/Naval Support Activity Crane

Louisiana
Naval Air Station Joint Reserve Base New Orleans

Maine
Portsmouth Naval Shipyard
NCTAMS LANT Det Cutler

Maryland
Indian Head Naval Surface Warfare Center
Walter Reed National Military Medical Center
Navy Information Operations Command Maryland
Naval Support Facility Thurmont
Naval Surface Warfare Center Carderock Division
Naval Air Station Patuxent River
Naval Support Activity Annapolis
United States Naval Academy, Annapolis

Mississippi
Naval Air Station Meridian
Naval Construction Battalion Center (Gulfport, Mississippi)
Stennis Space Center

Nevada
Naval Air Station Fallon

New Jersey
Naval Weapons Station Earle
Lakehurst Maxfield Field (formerly Naval Air Engineering Station Lakehurst) (part of Joint Base McGuire-Dix-Lakehurst

New Mexico
Naval Air Warfare Center Weapons Division, White Sands Detachment

New York
Naval Support Activity Saratoga Springs

North Dakota
Naval Computer and Telecommunications Area Master Station Atlantic Detachment LaMoure

Pennsylvania
Naval Support Activity Mechanicsburg
Naval Support Activity Philadelphia
Naval business center Philadelphia

Rhode Island
Naval Station Newport

South Carolina
Naval Support Activity Charleston
United States Naval Hospital Beaufort

Tennessee 
NSA Mid-South

Texas
Naval Air Station Corpus Christi
Naval Air Station Joint Reserve Base Fort Worth
Naval Air Station Kingsville
Medical Education and Training Campus

Virginia
Naval Air Station Oceana
Navy and Marine Corps Intelligence Training Center Dam Neck, Virginia
Naval Amphibious Base Little Creek
Naval Medical Center Portsmouth, Virginia 
Norfolk Naval Shipyard
Naval Security Group Activity Chesapeake
Naval Station Norfolk
Naval Support Activity South Potomac
Naval Surface Warfare Center Dahlgren Division
Naval Support Activity Hampton Roads 
Naval Weapons Station Yorktown
Training Support Center Hampton Roads, formerly Fleet Combat Training Center Atlantic Dam Neck
Wallops Island ASCS

Washington
Naval Station Everett
Naval Base Kitsap
Naval Submarine Base Bangor
Naval Station Bremerton
Naval Hospital Bremerton
Naval Undersea Warfare Center Keyport
Puget Sound Naval Shipyard
Naval Air Station Whidbey Island
Naval Magazine Indian Island
Jim Creek Naval Radio Station

Washington, D.C.
United States Naval Observatory
Naval Support Facility Anacostia
Washington Navy Yard
United States Naval Research Laboratory

West Virginia
Navy Information Operations Command Sugar Grove

United States territories

Guam
Naval Base Guam
Andersen Air Force Base 
United States Naval Hospital Guam
NCTAMS Guam

Puerto Rico
Aguada Transmission Station
Navy Operational Support Center Puerto Rico
Navy Reserve Support Detachment Roosevelt

Overseas

Australia
Naval Communication Station Harold E. Holt

Bahamas
Atlantic Undersea Test and Evaluation Center

Bahrain
Naval Support Activity Bahrain
Muharraq Airfield

Indian Ocean
Naval Support Facility Diego Garcia

El Salvador
Cooperative Security Location Comalapa, El Salvador

Cuba
Guantanamo Bay Naval Base

Djibouti
Camp Lemonnier

Greece
Naval Support Activity Souda Bay

Italy
Naval Support Activity Naples
Naval Support Activity Gaeta
Naval Air Station Sigonella
Augusta Bay Port Facility
Naval Computer and Telecommunications Station Naples, Italy

Japan
Naval Air Facility Atsugi
Misawa Air Base
Commander Fleet Activities Okinawa
Commander Fleet Activities Sasebo
Commander Fleet Activities Yokosuka
Naval Computer and Telecommunications Station Yokosuka, Japan

Republic of Korea
Commander Fleet Activities Chinhae

Kuwait
Kuwait Naval Base

Oman 
Masirah

Philippines
U.S. Naval Base Subic Bay

Qatar
Doha International Airport

Saudi Arabia
King Abdul Aziz IAP, Jeddah
King Fahd Naval Base, Jeddah

Singapore
Sembawang Naval Base

Spain
Naval Station Rota

United Arab Emirates
Fujairah International Airport
Jebel Ali Port Facility

See also
List of United States military bases
List of United States Marine Corps installations
List of United States Air Force installations
List of United States Coast Guard installations
List of United States Space Force installations

References

External links

List of Homeports
Naval Bases by State
US Military Facilities
Naval Web Sites Listed Alphabetically

 
Installations list
Navy